Talking Threads is a magazine-style programme targeted at the ever-increasing market for textile art that aims to inspire people to be creative with fabric. Shown on The Country Channel, on Sky TV, Talking Threads has a potential audience of fifty million people, with a large percentage of these being UK-based.

Series 1 
A pilot series of ten half-hour episodes will feature fabric artists giving demonstrations of the techniques which have made them accomplished artists. It was scheduled to be shown on October 14, 2009, on Sky Channel 171.

According to The Country Channel, Talking Threads is uniquely placed to attract a diverse audience:

The world of textile art is one that appeals to a vast demographic range: in addition to the more traditional sewing audience this programme would target everyone from parents watching with young children to university students wanting ideas for customizing their clothes.

The craft industry is not only unaffected by the credit crunch but has attracted a larger following as people turn to repairing or restyling old clothes to avoid purchasing new ones. Talking Threads is ideally placed to take advantage of the influx of people approaching textile and fabric art for the first time, while allowing those more experienced in the practice to see their favourite artists and their work.

Format 
Each episode is based around the artistic stylings of an artist, featuring a demonstration of how to make a specific piece, an interview and an exclusive look into their portfolio.

In every episode viewers are taught simple fabric art techniques, such as embellishing or fabric dyeing, from which they can expand their creative horizons. They are also taken through a step by step process culminating in the creation of their own piece of textile art. The final episode is filmed at The Festival of Quilts, at the Birmingham NEC.

Artists 
The following artists are featured in the series:
 Lulu Smith
 Angie Hughes
 Linda Mille
 Gilda Baron
 Anne Griffiths
 Jill Kennedy
 Fay Maxwell
 Myfanwy Hart
 Di Wells
 Kim Thittichai

DVD release 
It was recently confirmed that Series 1 will be made available on DVD.

References

External links 
talkingthreads.co.uk - Official Website
The Country Channel

British documentary television series
Textile arts